Ocinara ficicola is a moth in the family Bombycidae. It was described by Eleanor Anne Ormerod in 1889. It is found in the Democratic Republic of the Congo, Eritrea, Kenya, Nigeria, Somalia, South Africa and Uganda.

The larvae feed on Ficus species.

References

Bombycidae
Moths described in 1889